The Ministry of Public Security Qincheng Prison is a maximum-security prison located in Qincheng Village, Xingshou, Changping District, Beijing in the People's Republic of China. The prison was built in 1958 with aid from the Soviet Union and is the only prison belonging to China's Ministry of Public Security. The Ministry of Justice operates other non-military prisons.

Political prisoners have been incarcerated in Qincheng, among them participants in the Chinese democracy movement and Tiananmen Square protests of 1989. Famous former inmates include Li Rui, Jiang Qing, Yuan Geng, Bao Tong, Dai Qing, as well as Tibetan figures such as the 10th Panchen Lama Choekyi Gyaltsen and Phuntsok Wangyal. Other inmates included many communist cadres who struggled during the Cultural Revolution, such as Bo Yibo, Peng Zhen, Liu Xiaobo, Israel Epstein, Sidney Rittenberg and David Crook. More recently, high-ranking officials accused of corruption such as Chen Xitong, Chen Liangyu, Bo Xilai, and Zhou Yongkang were also imprisoned here.

The prison is located at the eastern foothill of Yanshan, facing the North China Plain in the east, north and south. The plain is where Qincheng Farm is located, which is part of the prison.

Origin
The prison was originally built to house Kuomintang (Nationalist) war criminals during Chinese civil war, but due to  secrecy, the name was not publicized. Instead, it was simply referred as project #156, since it was number 156 out of 157 projects that China established with Soviet assistance. The head of Beijing Bureau of Public Security, Feng Jiping was in charge of construction of the prison. Ironically, during the Cultural Revolution he was among the first to be jailed there. He was also one of the last to get out among those who were sent to the prison with him.

In 1958, high-ranking former Nationalists classified as war criminals by the communists were sent to Qincheng Farm to work, and they had observed the prison in construction. When prisoners questioned why an advanced educational institution such as a sport academy would have such heavy security measures, they were told that it was an advanced sport academy, and everything was learned from the Soviet Union.

Structure
The prison is built in accordance with the 1954 Reform Through Labor Regulations, so it is divided into three sections. The first section is for jail houses, and it includes both the jail houses for low-ranking prisoners and that of high-ranking prisoners, with the ranking often decided by the prisoner's social status, job position, and level of crime before entering the prisons. The second is called the Management and Work Section, the largest one among all three, with Qincheng Farm for field labors. The last section is the residential section for employees such as wardens and their relatives.

The prison is sandwiched between orchards, with farm land and fish pond in front, an exact reflection of Mao Zedong's claim in October, 1960: "our prisons are different than prisons in the past - each prison is actually a school, but also a factory or a farm."  Mao had further enhanced this on April 24, 1964, in his reaction to a case by claiming that "People can be reformed, if the correct policy and methods are adopted." This characteristic also applies to most Chinese prisons, and Chinese have called this prison system as: "Special militarized organization, special enterprise, and special school."

The jailhouse part has four buildings built upon the prison's establishment, with each having three stories. In 1967 an additional six buildings opened, with each not as large as each original building.

Cells
The original prison include four three-story brick buildings with sloped roof, each is named after celestial stems instead of numbers or alphabets: Jia, Yi, Bing, Ding. The area in front of each building is fenced with brick wall for prisoners to exercise, forming its own independent yard. Each exercise yard is divided into two sections evenly by a wall in the middle, on top of which guard patrolled, and would watch both sections. Each floor of the building is divided into many halls, on one side of the hall, there is a wall, opposite to the wall is where the cells are located, each individually locked with a padlock. There are at least 10 cells in each hall.

The wooden door of each cell is sandwiched between two iron plates, and there are two peepholes: one at the level of the toilet, while the other is above it. Around a foot from the ground, there is a rectangular window for delivering meals. The only furniture inside each cell is a bed that was around a foot from the ground and when a prisoner needs to write a confession or other materials, a desk similar to those in elementary schools would be provided. However, there would never be any chairs and prisoners must sit on the bed to write. For safety and security reasons, every sharp edge inside the cell has been changed to smooth/round shape. There are also special suicide watch cells with walls made of rubber so prisoners could not commit suicide by running into the walls.

There is a window for each cell designed for lower-ranking prisoners. The area of the window is around one square meter, located more than two meters above the ground. The windowsill is sloped upward with window opens upward toward outside, but of course, prisoners are unable to open the window themselves. There are three layers for every window: screen, iron fence, and glass painted white. In the cells for high-ranking prisoners, there are two windows but the outermost layer is sanded glass instead of glass painted white. Prisoners could neither see the courtyard nor any other buildings, but some could see the mountain and sun from their cells. A 15-watt light bulb with sanded glass is on the  ceiling, and it is covered by iron mesh, and the dim light is controlled by guards via a switch outside. By the 2010s prison cells had at least one window, with two windows for VIP prisoners, and the cells had washing machines, desks, and in-suite bathrooms. The Straits Times stated that after a mid-1990s remodeling the cells became more luxurious.

In 1967, six more buildings were added, also named after celestial stem, continuing as Wu, Ji, Geng, Xin, Ren, Gui. The new jail houses are concrete and contain many more cells because the new cells are much smaller in comparison to those in the blocks built in 1958: the area of each cell is only 5 to 10 square metres. The toilet in these new cells could not be sit on, but instead, prisoners must squatting down when using the toilet and must carry water from wash sink to flush the toilet. There are two doors for each cells built in 1967: the outer one is an iron door and the inside one is a wooden door. Other features of the blocks built in 1967 are similar to those built in 1958.

Entrance 
There are three gates at Qincheng Prison, the first gate has the heaviest guards presence. With the exception of prison staff and their relatives, all other people who are not prisoners entering the compound must have the permission slip from the 13th Bureau of the Ministry of Public Security of the People's Republic of China.

For prisoners, they would be first led to a small one-story building, where they would leave behind most of their belongings deemed to be unsuitable to be carried into cells, including shoelaces. The prisoners would then be given black prison uniforms and issued utensils, and personal hygiene materials. With the exception of a large enamel mug for water, everything else is plastic.

Administration 
Qincheng Prison has been under the administration of the 13th Bureau of the Ministry of Public Security most of the time since its establishment. Beginning in late October 1967, it came under the control of the People's Liberation Army which at this point had been put in charge of the 13th Bureau by the Central Cultural Revolution Group and Zhou Enlai. The "Military Control Commission of the 13th Bureau" administered the prison until April–June 1969 when the Bureau itself was abolished. The administration of Qincheng Prison now became the responsibility of a "Military Control Commission of Qincheng Prison" which reported to the Beijing municipal Bureau of Public Security Military Control Commission and not to the Ministry of Public Security. Thus formally "downgraded" in administrative terms, Qincheng was until the end of 1972 referred to in public documents as the Seventh Brigade of the Military Commission of the Beijing Bureau of Public Security. The Ministry of Public Security reasserted control over the prison in early 1973, after a decision to this effect had been taken by Premier Zhou Enlai on 8 January of that year.

During the reform in the 1980s, the combined judicial and executive roles of the Ministry of Public Security is separated and the Ministry of Public Security only retained its executive role. In June, 1983, the administration of prisons was transferred to the Ministry of Justice, but due to the special need, the Ministry of Public Security still retained several prisons under its administration and Qincheng Prison was one of them, still under the administration of the 13th Bureau of the Ministry of Public Security.

Originally designed to house Nationalist war criminals classified by the Communists, this category of prisoners no longer existed when the last batch were released in 1975. The largest category of prisoners is in fact, coming from within Communist ranks, like former cadres. The largest increase of prisoners occurred during Cultural Revolution, with extra buildings had to be built.

Management 
The prison employees are divided into two groups and are strictly separated. The first group is the interrogation / investigation team, which is only responsible for investigate the prisoners' cases, and they are strictly forbidden to venture into prisoners' cells or any other premises other than the interrogation room. The other group is responsible for guarding the prisoners and overseeing their daily activities. Unlike those from the first group, those in the second group are not even allowed to know the names of prisoners and call prisoners by their prisoner numbers.

Prison employees of both groups are strictly forbidden to make any personal connections to the prisoners and are not even allowed to reveal their names to the prisoners, ask prisoners questions without authorization, or answer prisoners' questions without authorization.

Didi Tang of the Associated Press wrote that "nothing says "politically connected" like Qincheng" and that "The better conditions in Qincheng underscore how the Chinese elite take care of their own, even in disgrace." Didi Tang stated that the conditions are not as luxurious as U.S. Club Fed facilities.

Names 
Once a prisoner enters the prison, his or her original name is no longer used. Instead, the prisoners are referred by number. The number consists of two parts, with the first two digits indicating the year the prisoner was sent to Qincheng prison, while the remaining digits are the sequential number. For example, prisoner 6299 means that the prisoner was sent to the prison in 1962, while he or she was the 99th prisoner sent to Qincheng Prison that year.

Prison employees are also prohibited from referring to each other by name, instead, they are called according to their job title, such as manager, warden, and director. However, their last names are sometimes allowed to be added before their job title when they are addressed.

Interrogation 
Prisoners are notified by a warden before the interrogation, and the warden would let the prisoner out of his or her cell, and lead the prisoner to the interrogation room. After the prisoner is seated in the interrogation room, the warden would withdraw and wait outside. Based on the experience of former prisoners, there are two type of interrogation rooms. Most prisoners are interrogated in the interrogation room with a stool inside where the prisoner sits, and facing the prisoner, there was a semicircle shaped platform. On top of the platform, there are several tables next to each other covered with white table cloth. Interrogators and recorders sit behind the tables at the opposite ends.

Dai Qing, a famous Chinese human rights activist jailed at Qincheng Prison recalls that there is another type of interrogation room in which the stool is replaced by a chair and there is carpet on the floor. Additionally, there is air conditioning in the room. During the Cultural Revolution, before the interrogation had begun, everyone in the room had to read some quotes from Mao's Little Red Book loudly, and these quotes are also posted on the wall.

Meals
Prisoners receive different meals based on their ages, crimes committed, social status and job positions prior entering the prison. The monthly food budget for each high-ranking prisoner had always been nearly twice of the monthly salary of most ordinary factory workers in China until the 1970s, which was 60 renminbi. This was increased to more than 120 yuan in the 1990s. However, the monthly food budget for each low-ranking prisoner was only above 30 yuan in the 1990s. Three meals were provided on each day, Monday through Saturday. On Sundays and holidays, only two meals are provided. Each prisoner would receive boiled water for three times daily, one full cup each time, and a large cup given to each prisoner for this purpose.

Breakfast consists of steamed corn flour bread and a piece of salted vegetable, while lunch and dinner consists of rice, noodle, and other grains. A vegetarian dish cooked with vegetables and a bowl of thin soup is also served with lunch and dinner.

High-ranking prisoners need not to keep utensils themselves and meals are served by opening the doors. Two vegetarian dishes and a dish with meat or fish, and bowl of thick soup are standard. A limited amount of milk and fruits are provided once weekly, and with special permission, some high-ranking prisoners can have a better meal that is often given to prisoners that are about to be released.

Shower
Depending on the ranking of the prisoner, every prisoner is allowed to take a half an hour long shower once either weekly or monthly, under the surveillance of the same gender warden outside the door. According to the 1954 Reform Through Labor Regulations of the People's Republic of China, female prisoners are supposed to be watched by female wardens but there were rarely any female wardens nor female prisoners at Qincheng prison.  The first significant presence of female prisoners appeared during Cultural Revolution, but by that era, the shower privilege granted to the prisoners were abolished like most other rights, and there were prisoners arrested at the beginning of Cultural Revolution who had not taken a shower for around a decade after they were jailed.

Exercise
Prisoners cannot earn the right to exercise immediately after entering the prison; they are only given the right later on. The frequency of exercise permitted for each prisoner may vary from once a day, to once a week. Officially, these prisoners are allowed to walk and exercise in the courtyards for a minimum of 20 minutes and a maximum of an hour. The actual times vary depending on the weather, the number of prisoners, and other factors.

Because of the special status of prisoners in Qincheng Prison, each prisoner is only allowed to exercise alone. Prisoners cannot see any other prisoners due to the high walls, and they are not allowed to see any other prisoners while they are in the jail house. If two prisoners are released from their cells to exercise and they meet each other, one is ordered to back to his or her cell to wait until the other prisoner is gone.

During prolonged solitary confinement during the Cultural Revolution, calcium deficiencies would result from the lack of exposure to sunlight. Many prisoners would lose their hair and teeth, and developed many other health problems. Prisoners jailed during the Cultural Revolution often had permanent disabilities after their release.

Sleep
Following the strict former-Soviet Union practice, until the early 1980s prisoners also had strict rules when they sleep: they must keep their hands above their sheets and they must face the peephole. Light will never be out when prisoners are asleep, because guards needs to check on prisoners. Prisoners are awoken by whistles at 7:00 in the morning sharp, and they go to bed at 21:00 sharp upon hearing whistles.

Originally, high-ranking prisoners have military style bed sheets, but low-ranking prisoners have to sleep on top of straws on their beds. If the prisoner have vanished from the guards' view, the wardens would immediately be notified to go into the cell to check what is going on.

Reading
The regular reading material in the jail is People's Daily. Other reading materials includes publications in China provided to prisoners by the visiting relatives of prisoners. There is a prison library that only high-ranking prisoners were allowed to use. Most reading materials were originally donated by the former Nationalists classified as war criminals by the Communists, and consist mostly of works by Mao Zedong, Karl Marx, Friedrich Engels, and Joseph Stalin. The other source of donation is from the prisoners' relatives and reading materials donated by released prisoners.

All reading materials are screened and those deemed improper for the prisoners are rejected. However, the censorship varies according to the political situation in China. For example, after the death of Lin Biao, copies of Quotations from Chairman Mao Zedong (Little Red Book) were confiscated and pages with Lin Biao's words were removed. Even during the era without any political turmoil, it is worth noting that many publications legally publicized in China and available to the general public would not be permitted for prisoners.

Visitation
Visitation is conducted in a special visitation room, which is a room separated into two sections by a wall. A small window is on the wall for the communication between the prisoners and their relatives. Wardens can be either watch the visitation from another room immediately adjacent to the visitation room, or can be directly behind the prisoner.

Anything brought into the prison by the prisoners' relatives must be screened and registered on a check sheet and those deemed unsuitable must be brought back immediately after the visitation is over. After visitation, there must be the signature of prison warden on the visitation permission slip for the relatives to leave the prison.

Labour
Prisoners at Qincheng Prison are tasked with manual labour instead of being executed in accordance with Mao Zedong's order given in 1957 in one of his speeches, in which Mao explained why political prisoners must not be executed:
1st: If one was executed, then more would have to be executed for the same crime later on for equality, and it would difficult to spare the lives of future prisoners who committed the same crime, because justice system would be criticized as unequal, giving preferential treatments
2nd: Wrong people and even innocent people might be executed by mistake
3rd: Executing prisoners could mean the vanishing of evidence
4th: When prisoners were executed it would not increase production output, would not improve scientific research, would not strengthen national defense, and would not liberate Taiwan
5th: You (the Communist regime) would be accused of excessive killings
Reactionaries are evil but once captured, they could be turned to something useful for the people.

As result of this speech of Mao, prisoners at Qincheng Prison are put to work instead of being executed, and they are subjected to be assigned to tasks other than that of the Qincheng Prison to help out outside the prison. Heavy manual labor was performed only by the nationalist war criminals classified by the communists, but since the release of the last group of these prisoners in 1975, there are no longer any such duties. However, light manual labors continues such as making straw hats and making boxes for matches. Jiang Qing requested and was permitted to make dolls. This light manual labor is often conducted in their own cells.

Abuse
Though physical and verbal abuse of prisoners are strictly forbidden, such regulations were completely ignored during Cultural Revolution, during which many prisoners died as result of abuse and torture. Abuses disguised as punishment commonly occurred during Cultural Revolution including forcing prisoners to stand for a prolonged period of time and not providing prisoners with enough water.

Wei Jingsheng had published under his name in March 1979 an essay denouncing the inhumane conditions of the Chinese Qincheng Prison where was imprisoned the 10th Panchen Lama and that drove the latter to a suicide attempt. It is clear that a major part of the essay of Wei was written by other anonymous authors with real information about Qincheng.

Healthcare 
There is a medical clinic at the Qincheng Prison with both doctors and nurses assigned. There is also a dental clinic, built of brick and stone, located further away from the main prison buildings. In addition to treating prisoners for ordinary illness, semi-annual physical checks are also performed. High-ranking prisoners could receive more frequent checks depending on their health conditions. Both the high-ranking and low-ranking prisoners receive better health care than ordinary citizens outside, and this situation has not changed since the first day when the prison was established.

For important high-ranking prisoners, the doctors at Qincheng Prison do not have the final decision-making authority on how to treat the prisoners for their illness. It is often a political decision determined by the top brass of the communist regime. For example, in the autumn of 1969 during Cultural Revolution, under Kang Sheng's order, an important high-ranking prisoner, Shi Zhe, the former personal secretary and personal Russian translator of Mao Zedong was jailed in Qincheng prison. He was scheduled to have an operation to remove a so-called cancer. However, doctors determined that there was no cancer at all, but Kang Sheng insisted on giving Shi Zhe an operation, and the completely unnecessary operation was carried out to fulfill the political task.

Hospital transfer 
When prisoners are seriously ill and thus cannot be treated at the prison clinic, they are transferred to Fuxing (复兴, Revival) Hospital on the Fuxingmen Outer Street. Fuxing Hospital is one of the hospitals for Ministry of Public Security employees and their relatives. All  Ministry of Public Security hospitals shoulder the additional responsibility of treating prisoners, but Fuxing Hospital is specially designated to treat prisoners from Qincheng Prison. The prison section is located on the 2nd Floor of one of the hospital buildings and it is completely segregated from the rest of the facility. Every room is about 10 square meters, with one or two hospital beds, a wash sink, and a toilet. The window is equipped with sanded glass so that nothing outside can be seen and there is another layer of iron fence outside the window glass. Guards watch the prisoners behind the door that is locked from outside. Prisoners treated at the hospital exercise by walking on the roof of the building.

Like the doctors in the prison clinic, doctors at Fuxing Hospital also lacked the final decision-making authority on how to treat the important prisoners. For example, during the Cultural Revolution, former Minister of Public Security and the head of Mao Zedong's personal bodyguards, Senior General Luo Ruiqing was jailed at Qincheng Prison. When he suffered a fracture to his left leg, he was first denied medical treatment, then subjected to an amputation which was to be the eventual cause of his death.

References

Further reading
 
 MacFarquhar, Roderick, and Michael Schoenhals, Mao's Last Revolution. Cambridge: Harvard University Press, 2006, pp. 342–345, 416, 442, 435.
 Wei Jingsheng, "A Twentieth-Century Bastille," translated in James D. Seymour, The Fifth Modernization, Standfordville NY: 1980, pp. 214–222.
 Yao Lun, "Qincheng jianyu de laiyou" (Origins of Qincheng Prison), in Sun Mingshan, ed., Lishi shunjian (Moments in History) vol. 2, Beijing: Qunzhong chubanshe, 2001, pp. 51–58.

External links 
 秦城监狱的由来（姚 伦） – Ministry of Public Security of the People's Republic of China.
 Laogai handbook

See also 

 Penal system in China
 MOJ Yancheng Prison

Prisons in Beijing
Cultural Revolution
Changping District